The Tricholomataceae are a family of fungi in the order Agaricales. A 2008 estimate placed 78 genera and 1020 species in the family. Subsequent molecular research, based on cladistic analysis of DNA sequences, has however found that this wide interpretation of the Tricholomataceae renders the family polyphyletic and is no longer tenable. 

In 2014, Sánchez-García and colleagues proposed a revised classification of the Tricholomataceae with just seven genera: Leucopaxillus, Tricholoma, Dennisiomyces, Porpoloma, and the newly circumscribed genera Corneriella, Pogonoloma (now moved to the Pseudoclitocybaceae), and Pseudotricholoma. 

Of the genera formerly placed in the Tricholomataceae, Amparoina is considered a synonym of Mycena; Callistosporium (with Pleurocollybia as a synonym) and Macrocybe have been moved to the Callistosporiaceae Catathelasma has been moved to the Biannulariaceae; Phyllotopsis and Tricholomopsis to the Phyllotopsidaceae; Leucopholiota and Squamanita to the Squamanitaceae; Pseudoclitocybe, Musumecia, and Pogonoloma to the Pseudoclitocybaceae; Cantharellopsis to the Rickenellaceae; Arthromyces to the Lyophyllaceae; and Hygroaster and Melanomphalia to the Hygrophoraceae; 

Following changes to the International Code of Nomenclature for algae, fungi, and plants, the practice of giving different names to teleomorph and anamorph forms of the same fungus has been discontinued. As a result two anamorphic genera referred to the Tricholomataceae become synonyms of their teleomorphs: Tilachlidiopsis becomes a synonym of Dendrocollybia and Nothoclavulina a synonym of Arthrosporella.

Currently (2023) the following ten genera are accepted in the Tricholomataceae sensu stricto: Albomagister, Corneriella, Dennisiomyces, Dermoloma, Leucopaxillus, Porpoloma, Pseudobaeospora, Pseudoporpoloma, Pseudotricholoma, and Tricholoma. An additional eleven genera are related, but not yet assigned to a family, and further genera await research. All are listed below.

Genera

Notes and references
Notes

References

See also
List of Agaricales families
List of Agaricales genera

Tricholomataceae